A. C. Moideen is an Indian politician. He is the current member of the 15th Kerala Legislature from Kunnamkulam constituency. He was the Minister for Local Self Government in the Pinarayi Vijayan ministry.

Personal life 
Son of Shri Chiyamu and Smt. Fathima Beevi, he was born at Wadakkanchery on 18 April 1956. He was married to Smt.Usaiba Beevi S and the couple have only one daughter Dr. Sheeba .

Political life

He entered politics through S.F.I. and was Secretary, K.S.Y.F. Wadakkanchery Area Committee, D.Y.F.I. Wadakkanchery Block Committee and Panangattukara Grameena Vayanasala; President, Thekkumkara Grama Panchayat, Kallampara Milk Marketing Co-operative Society; Secretary, C.P.I.(M) Thekkumkara Local Committee and Wadakkanchery Area Committee; Secretary, C.P.I.(M) District Committee, Thrissur.  He served as Minister for Co-operation and Tourism from 25 May 2016 to 21 November 2016.

He is now, Member, C.P.I.(M) State Committee; State Working Committee Member, Kerala Karshaka Sangham.

He was previously elected to the 11th KLA in the by-election on 10 May 2004, 12th KLA in 2006, 14th KLA in 2016.

References

Kerala politicians
Living people
Place of birth missing (living people)
1957 births